Namur River 174A is an Indian reserve of the Fort McKay First Nation in Alberta, located within the Regional Municipality of Wood Buffalo. It is 65 kilometres northwest of Fort McMurray.

References

Indian reserves in Alberta